Alice FitzHugh (c. 1448 – 10 July 1516) was the eldest daughter and co-heiress of Henry FitzHugh, 5th Baron FitzHugh, and Lady Alice Neville. Alice was born at the ancestral castle of Ravensworth. She married Sir John Fiennes, the son of Sir Richard Fiennes and Joan Dacre, 7th Baroness Dacre. Alice was a first cousin of Queen consort Anne Neville and great-aunt of Queen consort Catherine Parr.

Family
One of ten children, her siblings include Agnes, wife of Francis Lovell, 1st Viscount Lovell; Margery, who married Sir Marmaduke Constable; Joan, a nun; Lady Elizabeth, (grandmother to Queen Catherine Parr) who married William Parr, 1st Baron Parr of Kendal and then Sir Nicholas Vaux; and Richard, 6th Baron FitzHugh who married Hon. Elizabeth Burgh, daughter of Thomas Burgh, 1st Baron Burgh; their son, George, inherited the barony of FitzHugh, but after his death in 1513 the barony fell into abeyance between Alice and her nephew Sir Thomas Parr. This abeyance continues to the present day.

Her maternal grandparents were Richard Neville, 5th Earl of Salisbury and Lady Alice Montague, 5th Countess of Salisbury, suo jure, only daughter and heiress of Thomas Montacute, 4th Earl of Salisbury and Lady Eleanor Holland. Her paternal grandparents were William FitzHugh, 4th Baron FitzHugh and Margery Willoughby. Through her grandfather, the Earl of Salisbury, she was a niece of Richard Neville, 16th Earl of Warwick (known in history as "Warwick, the Kingmaker"), a grandniece of Cecily Neville, Duchess of York (mother of King Edward IV and King Richard III) and a great-grandniece of King Henry IV. Through her great-grandmother, Eleanor Holland, she was a great-great-grandniece of King Richard II and was also related to the York line of Kings and their successor Henry Tudor, who became King Henry VII.

At about the age of seventeen, Alice was married to Sir John Fiennes on 19 November 1466 at her home in Ravensworth, Yorkshire, England. After her marriage she lived at Herstmonceux Castle in East Sussex, about 300 miles (500 km) away from her family and home.

Alice had five sons and one daughter:

Anne Fiennes, Marchioness of Berkeley (about 1468 – 10 September 1497), married William de Berkeley, 1st Marquess of Berkeley, and secondly married Sir Thomas Brandon (1470 – 27 January 1509), uncle of Charles Brandon, 1st Duke of Suffolk. 
Thomas Fiennes, 8th Baron Dacre, married Anne Bourchier, the uterine sister of Elizabeth Howard (the wife of Thomas Boleyn), Lord Edmund Howard and Thomas Howard, 3rd Duke of Norfolk, and thus "half-aunt" of Queen Anne Boleyn and Queen Catherine Howard.
Richard Fiennes (born about 1476)
Edward Fiennes (born about 1478)
Roger Fiennes (born about 1480)
William Fiennes (born about 1483)

Ancestry

Notes

References

1516 deaths
Alice
16th-century English women
People from Ravensworth
1440s births